Água Rasa is a district within the subprefecture of Mooca in São Paulo, Brazil.

Neighborhoods
Água Rasa
Alto da Mooca
Chácara Mafalda
Chácara Paraíso
Jardim Guanabara
Jardim Haddad
Jardim Itália
Jardim Silveira
Vila Bertioga
Vila Celeste
Vila Cláudia
Vila Clotilde
Vila Diva
Vila Graciosa
Vila Invernada
Vila Leme
Vila Libanesa
Vila Lúcia Elvira
Vila Oratório
Vila Paulina
Vila Regente Feijó
Vila Rio Branco
Vila Santa Clara

References

Districts of São Paulo